The 1875 Stroud by-election was fought on 19 February 1875.  The byelection was fought due to the election of the incumbent Liberal MP, Henry Brand being voided on petition.  
It was won by the Liberal candidate Samuel Marling.

References

1875 elections in the United Kingdom
1875 in England
February 1875 events
19th century in Gloucestershire
Stroud District
By-elections to the Parliament of the United Kingdom in Gloucestershire constituencies